Fabian Hubertus Leendertz (born 11 November 1972 in Krefeld) is a German biologist, veterinarian, and expert on zoonosis, specialising his research on primates, studying leprosy and anthrax in chimpanzees since 2014. 

In 2020, he was appointed to the team researching the origins of COVID-19 by the World Health Organization, and was awarded a Champions of the Earth award by the United Nations. In 2021, he began a project group researching epidemiology and pathogenicity at the Robert Koch Institute, was appointed founding director of the Helmholtz Institute for One Health, and started a professorship at the University of Greifswald.

References 

1972 births
Living people
German biologists
German veterinarians
German educators